Laila Solveig Egman-Andersson (born 6 January 1942) is a retired Swedish artistic gymnast who competed at the 1960, 1964 and 1968 Summer Olympics. Her best individual achievement was 23rd place on the vault in 1964. She won four medals in five events at the 1963 European Championships.

References

1942 births
Living people
Swedish female artistic gymnasts
Gymnasts at the 1960 Summer Olympics
Gymnasts at the 1964 Summer Olympics
Gymnasts at the 1968 Summer Olympics
Olympic gymnasts of Sweden
European champions in gymnastics
20th-century Swedish women